Terry McBride (born September 16, 1958) is an American country music artist. Between 1989 and 1994, and again from 2000 to 2002, McBride was the lead vocalist and bass guitarist in the band McBride & the Ride, a country music group which recorded four studio albums and charted more than ten singles on the Billboard Hot Country Songs charts. He is also the son of 1970s country singer Dale McBride.

Solo career 
After McBride & the Ride disbanded in 1994, he found work as a songwriter, with country duo Brooks & Dunn recording more than twenty of his songs. This figure includes the Number One hits "If You See Him/If You See Her" (recorded with Reba McEntire,) and "Play Something Country". In addition, McBride co-wrote Josh Gracin's 2005 single "Stay with Me (Brass Bed)". For his contributions as a songwriter, McBride has won 12 awards from Broadcast Music Incorporated.

McBride also co-wrote Reba McEntire's 2010 single "I Keep On Loving You", Casey James' 2011 single "Let's Don't Call It a Night" and several tracks on former Brooks & Dunn member Ronnie Dunn's debut album.

In 2017, McBride released his first solo record, an extended play titled Hotels & Highways.

In 2018, McBride posted on his Instagram page that he was in the studio and working with producer Luke Laird on a new album.

In 2020, McBride released the album "Rebels & Angels", including 9 songs.

Discography

Terry McBride
 Hotels & Highways (2017)
 Rebels & Angels (2020)

McBride & the Ride
 Burnin' Up the Road (1990)
 Sacred Ground (1992)
 Hurry Sundown (1993)
 Terry McBride & the Ride (1994)
 Amarillo Sky (2002)

Songwriting credits

Awards and nominations

As McBride & the Ride

As Terry McBride

References

1958 births
American country bass guitarists
American male bass guitarists
American country singer-songwriters
American male singer-songwriters
Living people
Musicians from Austin, Texas
Singer-songwriters from Texas
Guitarists from Texas
20th-century American bass guitarists
People from Lampasas, Texas
Country musicians from Texas
20th-century American male musicians
McBride & the Ride members